Cappie may refer to:

 Cappie Pondexter (born 1983), American professional basketball player in the WNBA
Cappie (Captain John Paul Jones), a character from the TV series Greek played by Scott Michael Foster
Cappie the Witch, the younger sister of Hattie the Witch in Wallykazam!
 Cappie Roew, a character in the film Lucas played by Charlie Sheen
  Critics and Awards Program for High School Students, also known as the Cappies, an international program for recognizing, celebrating, and providing learning experiences for high school theater and journalism students and teenage playwrights

See also
 Cappy (disambiguation)